Hellifield is a railway station on the Bentham Line, which runs between  and  via . It is owned by Network Rail and managed by Northern Trains.

History
The first Hellifield railway station was opened by the "Little" North Western Railway in 1849. It was a modest structure, similar to those at Gargrave and Long Preston and sited  to the south of the present one.

It soon became a busy junction (as it was now located on the Midland Railway's main line from London to Scotland), with trains going to:

Clitheroe
 Skipton
Leeds
Blackburn
 Settle
 Carlisle
 Manchester Victoria
 Morecambe

It was also the location of a busy locomotive depot and a large goods yard.

The adjacent locomotive shed closed the following year and local trains from the station to Carlisle ended in May 1970, although it continued to be served by expresses to and from Glasgow until 1975. Thereafter it was downgraded to unstaffed halt status and served only by stopping trains between Leeds and Morecambe.

In April 1977 the main station building was designated as a Grade II listed building.

By the late 1980s the main buildings and canopies were in very poor condition and under threat of demolition, but following a £500,000 cash injection from British Rail in conjunction with English Heritage and the Railway Heritage Trust, they were refurbished and returned to private commercial use.  Trains to and from Carlisle also started calling again in May 1995 to further encourage use of the station and its newly restored amenities.

Between 2005 and 2008, the station was used as the operating base for Kingfisher Railtours' Dalesman steam-hauled charter trains over the Settle-Carlisle Line.  Facilities on offer to the travelling public at the station include the Long Drag cafe & gift shop and a heritage room used to exhibit items and photographs connected to the Settle-Carlisle route. The station is also still used by special trains and steam-hauled railway tours as a water stop and traction changeover point.  It has also undergone further structural refurbishment in the summer of 2013, with Network Rail carrying out £500,000 of work on the Grade II listed buildings to repair/replace the glazing and repaint the canopies.  The station has full step-free access, via a subway with inclined ramp from the main entrance.  Train running information can be obtained from timetable posters or by telephone, with digital PIS screens due to be installed in the autumn of 2019 (along with a ticket machine) as part of a rolling station upgrade programme by the train operator Northern.

It acts as the 'fringe' box to the Leeds workstation of York IECC in the Skipton direction, as well as controlling the junction and a pair of goods loops that are used to help regulate the increasingly heavy levels of freight traffic on the Carlisle, Leeds and Blackburn lines.

Station Masters

William Ash 1849 - ????
William Reynolds ca. 1859 - 1877
A. Greenwood 1877 - 1879
W. Jenkins 1879 - 1880
Robert L. Tudor 1880 - 1899 (afterwards station master at Bradford Forster Square)
George Margrave 1900 - 1905
Edwin Hooper Russell 1905 - 1917 (afterwards station master at Chesterfield)
William Henry Huff 1917 - ????
J.H. Duckworth 1927 - 1935 (afterwards station master of Courthouse and Exchange stations, Barnsley)
Charles Hopkins 1935 - ???? (formerly station master at Alfreton)
William Thomas ca. 1943

Accidents and incidents
On 22 December 1955, an express passenger train overran signals and was in a rear-end collision with another. Irregular operation of signals was a major contributory factor and the signalman at Hellifield South Junction was blamed for the accident.

Services

There is a regular service each day from Hellifield to Leeds and to Carlisle and Lancaster. There are fourteen services southbound on weekdays and fifteen on Saturdays (of which one runs only to Skipton). Northbound  there are eight trains each to Lancaster and to Carlisle plus one evening service to Ribblehead – these run about every two hours. Five of the Lancaster trains run through to Morecambe.  One train ran through to Heysham to connect with the daily ferry service to the Isle of Man, but from May 2018 it is necessary to change at Lancaster for Heysham (except on Sundays).

On Sundays there are six trains to Carlisle, five to Morecambe and eleven to Leeds, one of which continues to Nottingham.

Also on Sundays in the summer, a train operates from Blackpool North, Preston and Blackburn and along the Ribble Valley Line via Clitheroe to Hellifield and onwards towards Carlisle in the summer (this terminates/starts here in the winter, but with an onward connection north). This service, DalesRail, is operated by Northern Trains. There are plans for more services from Clitheroe. The Ribble Valley Rail group is campaigning for this route to be re-opened.

References

Sources

External links
 

Craven District
DfT Category F2 stations
Railway stations in North Yorkshire
Former Midland Railway stations
Railway stations in Great Britain opened in 1880
Northern franchise railway stations
Grade II listed buildings in North Yorkshire
Charles Trubshaw railway stations
Grade II listed railway stations